Nicholas "Nick" Vachon (born July 20, 1972) is a Canadian former ice hockey player.

Biography
Born in Montreal, Quebec, Vachon is the son of former NHL goaltender Rogie Vachon.

As a youth, Vachon played in the 1984 Quebec International Pee-Wee Hockey Tournament with a minor ice hockey team from Los Angeles.

He was drafted in the 12th round, 241st overall in 1990 by the Toronto Maple Leafs. In his career, he played one National Hockey League game for the New York Islanders in 1996.
He also played the title character in George Plamondon's 2003 short film Clark: The Canadian Hockey Goalie.

Career statistics

See also
List of players who played only one game in the NHL

References

External links

1972 births
Living people
Atlanta Knights players
Boston University Terriers men's ice hockey players
Canadian ice hockey left wingers
Ice hockey people from Montreal
Knoxville Cherokees players
Long Beach Ice Dogs (IHL) players
Los Angeles Blades players
New York Islanders players
Phoenix Roadrunners (IHL) players
Portland Winterhawks players
Springfield Falcons players
Toronto Maple Leafs draft picks
Utah Grizzlies (IHL) players
Canadian expatriate ice hockey players in the United States